Sandcut is an unincorporated community in Otter Creek Township, Vigo County, in the U.S. state of Indiana. It is part of the Terre Haute metropolitan area. Little Gundy Creek flows on the southeastern side of Sandcut. Sandcut also has a volunteer fire department.

History
Sandcut was founded in 1927, and was so named because of its sandy soil.

Geography

References

Unincorporated communities in Indiana
Unincorporated communities in Vigo County, Indiana
Terre Haute metropolitan area